John Kitchen (by 1507 – 1562), of Hatfield, Hertfordshire and Pilling, Lancashire, was an English politician.

He was a Member (MP) of the Parliament of England for Lancashire in 1545 and 1547.

References

1562 deaths
People from the Borough of Wyre
People from Hatfield, Hertfordshire
English MPs 1545–1547
English MPs 1547–1552
Year of birth uncertain
Members of the Parliament of England (pre-1707) for Lancashire